Fritz David Carlson (23 July 1888 – 28 November 1952) was a Swedish mathematician. After the death of Torsten Carleman, he headed the Mittag-Leffler Institute.

Carlson's contributions to analysis include Carlson's theorem, the Polyá–Carlson theorem on rational functions, and Carlson's inequality

 

In number theory, his results include Carlson's theorem on Dirichlet series.

Hans Rådström, Germund Dahlquist, and Tord Ganelius were among his students.

Notes

External links

1888 births
1952 deaths
20th-century Swedish mathematicians
Academic staff of the KTH Royal Institute of Technology
Mathematical analysts
Directors of the Mittag-Leffler Institute